Wicklow is a parliamentary constituency represented in Dáil Éireann, the lower house of the Irish parliament or Oireachtas. The constituency elects 5 deputies (Teachtaí Dála, commonly known as TDs) on the system of proportional representation by means of the single transferable vote (PR-STV).

Boundaries
The constituency spans the entire area of County Wicklow, including the towns of Wicklow, Arklow, Baltinglass, Greystones and Bray.

The Electoral (Amendment) (Dáil Constituencies) Act 2017 defines the constituency as:

TDs

Elections

2020 general election

2016 general election

2011 general election

2007 general election

2002 general election

1997 general election

1995 by-election
Following the death of Independent TD Johnny Fox, a by-election was held on 29 June 1995. The seat was won by the Independent candidate Mildred Fox, daughter of the deceased TD.

1992 general election

1989 general election

1987 general election

November 1982 general election

February 1982 general election

1981 general election

1977 general election

1973 general election

1969 general election

1968 by-election
Following the death of Labour Party TD James Everett, a by-election was held on 14 March 1968. The seat was won by the candidate Fine Gael Godfrey Timmins.

1965 general election

1961 general election

1957 general election

1954 general election

1953 by-election
Following the death of Fianna Fáil TD Thomas Brennan, a by-election was held on 18 June 1953. The seat was won by the Fine Gael candidate Mark Deering.

1951 general election

1948 general election

1944 general election
Figures for the 6th count are not available.

1943 general election

1938 general election

1937 general election

1933 general election

1932 general election

September 1927 general election

June 1927 general election

1923 general election

See also
Dáil constituencies
Elections in the Republic of Ireland
Politics of the Republic of Ireland
List of Dáil by-elections
List of political parties in the Republic of Ireland

References

Dáil constituencies
Politics of County Wicklow
1923 establishments in Ireland
Constituencies established in 1923